Just in Case is a young-adult novel by Meg Rosoff published by Penguin in 2006. Its adolescent protagonist David Case spends the majority of the book attempting to avoid fate. Rosoff won the annual Carnegie Medal, recognising the year's best children's book published in the U.K. In a press release announcing the award, the librarians called it "a story about death, depression, sex, choice and survival."

Just in Case also won the German Jugendliteraturpreis and made the shortlists for the Booktrust Teenage Prize and the 2006 Costa Book Awards.

Random House (Wendy Lamb Books) published the first U.S. edition, also in 2006.

Plot summary
The book is set in Luton, Bedfordshire where fifteen-year-old David Case saves his younger brother from falling out of an open window. Scared by the experience, he starts to see danger everywhere, believes that Fate is stalking him, and decides to change his identity in order to escape his destiny. He changes his name to Justin, adopts a new wardrobe, seeks out new friends, acquires an imaginary dog, all in the hope of avoiding Fate. His new, moody, self-absorbed persona attracts attention, not all of it good, and Fate is not fooled at all.

The title and David's adopted name Justin Case refer to his preparation phobia.

See also

References

External links
  —immediately, first US edition 

2006 British novels
2006 children's books
British young adult novels
Carnegie Medal in Literature winning works
Novels set in Bedfordshire
Wendy Lamb Books books